Frederick Ernest De La Fontaine (30 January 1878 - 9 December 1957) was an Australian rules footballer who played for the Fitzroy Football Club in the Victorian Football League (VFL).

Fontaine played in a variety of positions during his career and was a member of a very successful Fitzroy side, winning four grand finals and losing two. Of the four premierships his most notable performance came in the 1904 decider where he played at full back and set up the winning goal to Percy Trotter after making a run from defence.

References

External links

1878 births
1957 deaths
Australian rules footballers from Melbourne
Australian Rules footballers: place kick exponents
Fitzroy Football Club players
Fitzroy Football Club Premiership players
Four-time VFL/AFL Premiership players
People from Richmond, Victoria